Nowzad (also Romanized as Nowzād; also known as Nowzār, Nauzār, and Nowz̄ar) is a village in Naharjan Rural District, Mud District, Sarbisheh County, South Khorasan Province, Iran. At the 2006 census, its population was 27, in 8 families.

References 

Populated places in Sarbisheh County